Rodolfo Adrian Pérez Gentile (born October 21, 1967) is a former field hockey player from Argentina. He twice competed for his native country at the Summer Olympics: in 1992 and 1996. Pérez finished in ninth and eleventh place with the national squad.

References
Profile

External links
 

1967 births
Living people
Argentine male field hockey players
Field hockey players at the 1992 Summer Olympics
Field hockey players at the 1996 Summer Olympics
Olympic field hockey players of Argentina
Pan American Games gold medalists for Argentina
Pan American Games silver medalists for Argentina
Pan American Games medalists in field hockey
Field hockey players at the 1991 Pan American Games
Field hockey players at the 1995 Pan American Games
Field hockey players at the 1999 Pan American Games
1990 Men's Hockey World Cup players
Medalists at the 1995 Pan American Games
Medalists at the 1991 Pan American Games
20th-century Argentine people